Petra Vogt is a German actor, visual artist, performance artist, poet and one-time partner of poet and publisher Ira Cohen.

Beginning in 1962, Vogt performed with the experimental Living Theatre in Europe. During the organizations’ period in New York in the late 1960s, she acted in multiple productions directed by Julian Beck and Judith Malina including Frankenstein (1968), Paradise Now (1968), Mysteries and Other Pieces (1968) and Bertold Brecht’s Antigone (1968–1969).

After meeting Ira Cohen, Vogt travelled with him to Kathmandu, Nepal in 1970 and remained there for many years as a member of a thriving community of expatriate European and American artists and writers.  With Cohen, Angus Maclise, and Hetty Maclise, she worked on publications for the small press Bardo Matrix. Vogt collaborated extensively with Cohen, posing for many of his well-known photographs.

In the late 1970s, Vogt moved to India and is believed to be living as a Brahma Kumari nun in Europe today.

Publications 
Illustration for Paul Bowles, Next to Nothing (Kathmandu: Bardo Matrix, 1976)

Illustrations for Ira Cohen, Poems from the Cosmic Crypt (Kathmandu: Bardo Matrix and Kali Press, 1976)

Illustration and model for photograph in Ira Cohen, From the Divan of Petra Vogt (Rotterdam: Cold Turkey Press, 1976)

Poem in Living Theatre Poems (New York: Boss, 1968)

Archive 
Petra Vogt's papers reside at the Albert and Shirley Small Special Collections Library at the University of Virginia.

References

Living people
Year of birth missing (living people)
German actresses
German performance artists